Umroli is a railway station on the Western line of the Mumbai Suburban Railway network. It a station that falls between Palghar and Boisar. All Dahanu bound local trains halt at Umroli Road Station. Area is getting developed at a very fast rate as it falls in vicinity of Boisar and Palghar.

Railway stations in Palghar district
Mumbai Suburban Railway stations
Mumbai WR railway division